Yauza is a Moscow Railway station on the Yaroslavsky suburban railway line in Moscow, Russia. It is located on the border of Eastern and North-Eastern Administrative Okrugs,  from Yaroslavsky railway terminal.

There are exits at Malakhitovaya Street and Yauzskaya Alley.

References

Railway stations in Moscow
Railway stations of Moscow Railway
Railway stations in the Soviet Union opened in 1934